Aiki-jō (Kanji: 合気杖 Hiragana: あいきじょう) is the name given specifically to the set of martial art techniques practiced with a jō (a wooden staff about four feet long), according to the principles of aikido. Jō techniques were introduced into aikido by Morihei Ueshiba, aikido's founder, and further developed by Morihiro Saito, one of Ueshiba's most prominent students.

Development of aiki-jō
Much of the aiki-jō syllabus was developed by Morihei Ueshiba (植芝 盛平 Ueshiba Morihei, 1883–1969) at his dojo in Iwama, Japan, at the same time he developed aikido's sword training (called aiki-ken). It is well documented that Ueshiba studied several different styles of martial arts, including the art of the spear (sōjutsu) and the modern art of the bayonet or "Jūkendō". The aiki-jō techniques taught by Ueshiba were a distillation and modification of that training, with an emphasis upon the use  of the jō as a method for the refinement of one's empty-handed aikido techniques. Some practitioners of traditional Japanese martial arts have noted that aiki-jō techniques bear more resemblance to jukendo (bayonet fighting, which Ueshiba studied during the Russo-Japanese War) than to classical Japanese spear Sōjutsu and staff Bōjutsu systems.

Note that the practice of Aiki-jō is not universal. Some schools of aikido incorporate weapons training that is unrelated to aiki-jō, and others cast aside weapons training entirely.

Aiki-jō Practice
Aiki-jō practice can help uncover errors in the student's empty-handed aikido technique, and provides an opportunity to apply the principles of aikido in different situations.  Saito codified three sets of techniques, the first being twenty suburi (solo cutting exercises), the second being ten partnered forms, and the third being two kata (solo forms).  Some dojo also practice jiyu-waza armed with jō (a freestyle technique without a predetermined form of attack and response).

Suburi
, a word that translates literally to something like "elementary swinging", is used to refer to the basic solo movements of aiki-jō, developed by Saito as a distillation of the forms and partnered practice.

There are twenty aiki-jō suburi.  They are divided into sub-groups and named as follows (the English given is an approximate translation):

Five  Movements
1. 
2. 
3. 
4. 
5. 

Five  Movements
6. 
7. 
8. 
9. 
10. 

Three  Movements
11. 
12. 
13. 

Five  Movements
14. 
15. 
16. 
17. 
18. 

Two  Movements
19. 
20.

Kumijō
The partnered forms practice of aiki-jō is called , meaning the crossing/meeting of staves. There are ten kumijō in Saito's aiki-jō curriculum. Ueshiba originally taught various partnered drills and techniques with the jō, and Saito originally codified them into a discrete series of seven such partner drills.  In 1983, Saito was set to give a public demonstration, and so devised three more kumijō at that time.

The kumijō teach students how to alternately control the center line and move off of it to avoid attacks as well as how to blend with an opponent's attacks, among other skills. Improvisational variations on the kumijō (called henka), which generally cause the kumijō form to end early with one person taking advantage of an opening to strike or throw the other, are also taught.

Kata
Kata, simply meaning "forms", are typically solo, using a predetermined series of techniques practiced against an imaginary opponent.  In the aiki-jō curriculum, there are three primary kata.  The first is called "Sanjūichi no Jō", generally referred to in English as the "Thirty-one Point Jō Kata", and was taught by Ueshiba.  The second one is "Jūsan no Jō"; "Thirteen Point Jō Kata". The third one is "Roku no jō".  There are also well known partnered versions of these forms, called bunkai.

See also
Aiki (martial arts principle)

References

Aikido